A keyboard computer is a computer which contains all of the regular components of a personal computer, except for a screen, in the same housing as the keyboard. The power supply is typically external and connects to the computer via an adapter cable. The motherboard is specially designed to fit inside, and the device is larger than most standard keyboards. Additional peripheral components such as a monitor are connected to the computer via external ports. Usually a minimum of storage devices, if any, is built in.

Most home computers of the late 1970s and during the 1980s were keyboard computers, the ZX Spectrum and most models of the Atari ST, Xiao Bawang, Commodore 64. and Amiga being prime examples. While this form factor went out of style around 1990 in favour for more standard PC setups, some notable x86 keyboard computers have been built, like the Olivetti Prodest PC1 in 1988 and the Schneider EuroPC Series between 1988 and 1995.

Newer developments include the Commodore 64 WebIt by Tulip, the Asus Eee Keyboard, which uses Intel Atom processors and solid state hard drives, and the (never-released) Commodore Invictus PC.  Raspberry Pi Foundation announced Raspberry Pi 400, a modified version of their previous Raspberry Pi 4 housed entirely within a keyboard, in November 2020, with "quad-core 64-bit processor, 4GB of RAM, wireless networking, dual-display output, and 4K video playback, as well as a 40-pin GPIO header".

References

Classes of computers